Naomi Yamamoto (born 1960 or 1961) is a Canadian politician who was elected as a Member of the Legislative Assembly of British Columbia in the 2009 provincial election. She was elected as a member of the BC Liberal Party in the riding of North Vancouver-Lonsdale. Yamamoto's party formed a majority government in the 39th Parliament and Premier Gordon Campbell included her in his cabinet, between June 2009 and October 2010, as Minister of State for Intergovernmental Relations, and then  as Minister of State for Building Code Renewal between October 2010 and March 2011. Following the 2011 BC Liberal leadership election, in which Yamamoto endorsed George Abbott, the new Premier, Christy Clark, promoted Yamamoto to Minister of Advanced Education.

Yamamoto has introduced one piece of legislation, the Advanced Education Statutes Amendment Act, 2011, which sought to implement several measures, including expanding the Personal Education Number system which tracks students in the BC educational system to also include private educational institutions, specifying that board members of colleges and universities are to act in the best interests of the institution, and updating the Architectural Institute of BC's dispute resolution process. The bill was introduced on November 3, 2011, but was not adopted before the winter break.

Prior to her election to the legislature, Yamamoto owned and operated a business that started as a specialty shop for laser printing but evolved to focus on design and had created props for the television and film industry. She spent time on the governing boards of Capilano College, the North Shore Credit Union, the Vancouver Coastal Health Authority, and the Gordon and Marion Smith Foundation. She completed one term as president of the B.C. Chamber of Commerce and worked as the president and general manager of the North Vancouver Chamber of Commerce from 2007 until she was elected as MLA.

Background
Yamamoto is a third-generation Japanese-Canadian. Both her parents were born in Vancouver, but were interned in the Kootenays for part of World War II. Yamamoto was also born in Vancouver and grew up with one brother and one sister, who all moved to North Vancouver in 1970. Her father had instilled in her an appreciation of outdoor activities, such as fishing, trail running, and cycling, which turned into lifelong hobbies.

She graduated, in 1982, from the University of British Columbia where she studied film and television production. Then she went to work at her family's Japan Camera outlet for seven years. In 1988, along with a business partner, she opened her own company, Lasercolor Design & Printing, which specialized in laser printing. With a growing clientele in the film and television industry who needed props, the business was renamed  Lasercolor Business Graphics and Props. As laser printing became more common, the company was renamed again to Tora Design, focusing more on the design aspect.

She started volunteering at the North Shore Neighbourhood House, which assisted seniors and at-risk children. She was active with the North Vancouver Chamber of Commerce and served one tern (1997–98) as president of the B.C. Chamber of Commerce. She spent six years, beginning in 1995, on the Capilano College board of governors and eleven years, beginning in 1998, on the North Shore Credit Union board of directors as well as eight years, beginning in 2001, on the Vancouver Coastal Health board of directors.

In 1998 she helped organize a BC-specific economic summit and participate in a provincial government task force examining how to improve the province's economy. All her activities were recognized by the Vancouver Board of Trade, in 2000, with the Women in the Spotlight Award and by the newspaper Business in Vancouver, in 2003, with their Influential Women in Business Award. She also served on the board of directors for the Gordon and Marion Smith Foundation for Young Artists, beginning in 2004.

In February 2007 she started work as the president and general manager of the North Vancouver Chamber of Commerce, a position she kept until she was elected as MLA. As president of the NV Chamber of Commerce she supported the introduction of the carbon tax and opposed a proposal for introducing a statutory holiday in February.

Provincial politics
Yamamoto expressed interest in pursuing a career in provincial politics in June 2008 when there was speculation that long-time MLA Daniel Jarvis was going to retire. While Jarvis kept his options open, fellow MLA Katherine Whittred did retire, and in the subsequent BC Liberal Party nomination meeting, Yamamoto was challenged by former Member of Parliament Don Bell and former Vancouver city councillor Jennifer Clarke. Yamamoto was considered the underdog but defeated Bell in the second round of the preferential ballot. In the subsequent general election, held in May 2009, Yamamoto was challenged by former North Vancouver mayor Janice Harris for the BC New Democratic Party, acupuncturist Michelle Corcos for the Green Party, former leader of the BC Reform Party Ron Gamble, and BC Conservative Party candidate Ian McLeod. While the riding was previously considered safe for the BC Liberals, Harris was also considered a star candidate for the NDP. Both candidates had awkward moments, with Yamamoto refusing to participate in an all-candidates forum sponsored by the local teacher's association. The North Shore Credit Union, of which Harris was a member and Yamamoto a board member, had donated $7,500 to the BC Liberal Party. Nonetheless, Yamamoto won the election, making her the first person with Japanese ancestry to be elected as a MLA in BC.

In the 39th Parliament, Yamamoto's BC Liberal Party formed a majority government. She was not appointed to any committees but Premier Gordon Campbell included her in his cabinet as Minister of State for Intergovernmental Relations. In this position she worked with American and Canadian federal officials in resolving US-Canada border issues prior to the 2010 Winter Olympics in Vancouver, as well as hosting officials from other governments during the games. She helped coordinate the provincial government response to the US state of Montana and the United Nations concerning resource extraction in Flathead River Valley that was impacting the Waterton-Glacier International Peace Park; the province implemented a short term ban on mining and oil/gas extraction, followed a permanent ban in a designated area with the Flathead Watershed Area Conservation Act in 2011.

She was a strong advocate of the Harmonized Sales Tax, as she had been lobbying in favour its introduction in BC for years prior to running for political office. However, it proved to be an unpopular initiative with 6,786 people in the North Vancouver-Lonsdale signing the FightHST group's petition asking for it to be repealed. The FightHST group also considered conducting a recall campaign against Yamamoto. Just prior to his resignation, Premier Campbell shuffled his cabinet, moving Yamamoto Minister of State for Building Code Renewal. In this role she was to oversee the modernization of the provincial building code with considerations given to new techniques and technologies, as well as reconciling provisions for single- and multi-family dwellings. In the 2011 BC Liberal leadership election, following Campbell's resignation, Yamamoto endorsed George Abbott. She had found all the leadership contenders held similar views on economic issues, health care and education, but that Abbott was the more personable contender. After Christy Clark won the party leadership, and became premier, she promoted Yamamoto to Minister of Advanced Education. She toured various post-secondary institutions across the province and announced $1.5 million for healthcare training programs, $500,000 for a First Nations teaching program, $300,000 to train First Nations aquaculture workers. She rebuffed calls for greater student affordability and provincial funding for the universities, defending the existing student loan program and the existing provincial funding formula, citing the "challenging fiscal environment". She advocated for a greater role for international students, which Premier Clark's BC Jobs Plan called for increasing by 50% within four years the number of international students in BC. The BC Jobs Plan also called for the creation of a new international education council, which seemed to duplicate the existing BC Council for International Education and led to criticism that the government was either re-announcing old measures or were not aware of the existing council. Yamamoto supported the creation of the new council, as an independent steering committee with a broader scope.

As Minister of Advanced Education, Yamamoto introduced the Advanced Education Statutes Amendment Act, 2011 (Bill 18), which sought to implement several measures, including harmonizing the federal and provincial student load procedure, expanding the Personal Education Number system which tracks students in the BC educational system to also include private educational institutions, specifying that board members of colleges and universities are to act in the best interests of the institution, and updating the Architectural Institute of BC's dispute resolution process. The bill was introduced on November 3, 2011, but was not adopted before the winter break.

Electoral history

2017

2013

2009

|-

|- bgcolor="white"
!align="right" colspan=3|Total Valid Votes
!align="right"|20,997
!align="right"|100
!align="right"|
!align="right"|
|- bgcolor="white"
!align="right" colspan=3|Total Rejected Ballots
!align="right"|163
!align="right"|0.8
!align="right"|
!align="right"|
|- bgcolor="white"
!align="right" colspan=3|Turnout
!align="right"|21,160
!align="right"|56
!align="right"|
!align="right"|
|}

References

External links
 Legislative Assembly of British Columbia - Naomi Yamamoto
 Member of the Legislative Assembly - Naomi Yamamoto (North Vancouver-Lonsdale)
 British Columbia Liberal Party - Naomi Yamamoto

British Columbia Liberal Party MLAs
Women government ministers of Canada
Capilano University
Living people
Members of the Executive Council of British Columbia
People from North Vancouver
Politicians from Vancouver
Women MLAs in British Columbia
Year of birth missing (living people)
21st-century Canadian politicians
21st-century Canadian women politicians
Canadian politicians of Japanese descent